The Boston Weekly Messenger (1811–1861) was a newspaper in Boston, Massachusetts, in the 19th century. Publishers/editors included James Cutler and Nathan Hale. It began as "a political journal, established in 1811 by a company of young federalists, chief among whom was John Lowell." It consisted "largely of current news taken from the Boston Daily Advertiser;" the two papers shared an office at no.6 Congress Street.

Variant titles
 The Weekly Messenger, 1811–1815
 Boston Weekly Messenger, 1815–1832, 1833–1861
 Boston Weekly Messenger and Massachusetts Journal, 1832–1833

References

External links

 Boston Public Library. Weekly Messenger, 6 March, 1812
 1812 History. Weekly Messenger, 15 October, 1813

1811 establishments in Massachusetts
Publications established in 1811
Newspapers published in Boston
1861 disestablishments in Massachusetts
19th century in Boston
Defunct newspapers published in Massachusetts
Publications disestablished in 1861